The Courageous Avenger is a 1935 American Western film directed by Robert N. Bradbury.

Cast 
 Johnny Mack Brown as Kirk Baxter

Soundtrack

External links 
 

1935 films
1935 Western (genre) films
1930s English-language films
American black-and-white films
American Western (genre) films
Films directed by Robert N. Bradbury
1930s American films